Philippen's striped turtle, "Mauremys" philippeni, has recently shown to be an intergeneric hybrid (Stuart & Parham, 2006) between a male Mauremys sinensis and a female Cuora trifasciata.

The "species" is known only from a handful of specimens (mainly the type series), said to originate from Hainan, but all acquired from a pet trader in Hong Kong.

Etymology
The specific name, phillipeni, is in honor of German herpetologist Hans-Dieter Phillipen (born 1957).

References

External links
 

Reptiles of China
Mauremys
Reptiles described in 1992
Taxonomy articles created by Polbot
Hybrid animals
Intergeneric hybrids